Mark Edwards is a Paralympic medalist from New Zealand who competed in alpine skiing.  He competed in the 1984 Winter Paralympics where he won a bronze medal in downhill.

References

External links 
 
 

Alpine skiers at the 1984 Winter Paralympics
Paralympic bronze medalists for New Zealand
Living people
Year of birth missing (living people)
Medalists at the 1984 Winter Paralympics
New Zealand male alpine skiers
Paralympic medalists in alpine skiing
Paralympic alpine skiers of New Zealand